A conjuratory or exconjuratory is a small religious building from which ceremonies were conducted to bless the fields and ward off calamities caused by the weather, like storms, hail and excessive rain that could ruin the harvests. Usually these buildings are attached to a church building or a hermitage.

Exconjuratories were common in the ancient villages of the Pre-Pyrenees and the Pyrenees, especially in Aragon.

Description
Exconjuratories were usually built in a symmetrical way, with large windows open to the four cardinal points.

In some places the exconjuratory is part of the bell tower of a church. On the fourth floor of the main tower of the Cathedral of Murcia there are four conjuratories. Located in each corner, special ceremonies were conducted in them by priests to ward off storms that could spoil the harvest in the fields by means of the Lignum Crucis kept in the cathedral. Other towns in the Region of Murcia like Cieza, had conjuratories as well. Conjuratories could also be used to ward off other non-weather-related catastrophical events afflicting the community, like epidemics and crop-damaging pests, like locusts.

They fell into disuse centuries ago and many of the exconjuratories that have survived are in a ruined state.

Rituals
The Tentenublo (in Spanish) is an example of the prayers conducted in special occasions within the conjuratories:

Gallery

References

External links

Esconchurador d'a Cruz Blanca  
Hiking Route, including images and references about Exconjuratories
Concatedral de Santa María de La Redonda - Logroño
"Esconjuradero" label in Flickr
Carmen Gozalo de Andrés, Meteorología popular: Acordarse de Santa Bárbara cuando truena

Christian practices
Christian buildings and structures in Spain